Southpaw is another name for a left-handed individual, particularly in sports. Southpaw may also refer to:

Arts and entertainment
 The Southpaw, a 1952 novel by Mark Harris
 Southpaw (comics), a fictional character in the Marvel comic She-Hulk
 Southpaw (film), a 2015 film starring Jake Gyllenhaal
Southpaw: The Francis Barrett Story, 1999 documentary film about boxer Francie Barrett

Music
 Southpaw (album), a 1977 album by Gilbert O'Sullivan
 "Southpaw" (Pink Lady song), a 1978 song by Pink Lady
 "Southpaw" (Morrissey song), song by Morrissey
 Southpaw (soundtrack), a movie soundtrack by Eminem
 "Southpaw", a song by the Afghan Whigs from their 1990 album Up in It

Sports
 Southpaw stance, the normal stance for a left-handed boxer
 Southpaw (Chicago White Sox mascot), a mascot of the Chicago White Sox

Other
 Southpaw Technology, an open-source software company
 Southpaw engine, a video game engine for the Game Boy Advance
 Southpaw, a NODAL-related gene involved in left-right body patterning in vertebrates